Badaga is a southern Dravidian language spoken by the Badaga people of the Nilgiris district of Tamil Nadu. The language is closely related to the Tamil and Kannada languages.
Of all the tribal languages spoken in Nilgiris (Badaga, Toda language, Kota language (India)), Badaga is the most spoken language.

Writing system 
Several attempts have been made at constructing an orthography based on English, Kannada and Tamil. The earliest printed book using Kannada script was a Christian work, "Anga Kartagibba Yesu Kristana Olleya Suddiya Pustaka" by Basel Mission Press of Mangaluru in 1890.

Badaga can also be written in the Kannada script and Tamil script.

Dictionary 
Badaga is well studied and several Badaga-English Dictionaries have been produced since the latter part of the nineteenth century.

References

External links 

 Online community of Badagas worldwide
 Badaga literature
 A website on the Badaga
 Audio recordings in Badaga, with annotations in trilingual format (Badaga, English, French)  – transcribed and translated by C. Pilot-Raichoor – site of the Pangloss Collection, CNRS-LACITO

Dravidian languages
Endangered diaspora languages
Languages of Tamil Nadu